Lucy Fry Mathews (1830–1904) was the wife of former Governor of West Virginia Henry M. Mathews and served as that state's First Lady (1877–1881).  She was born in 1830, at Frankford, West Virginia. In 1857, she married Henry M. Mathews.   After leaving office, the Mathews moved to Lewisburg, West Virginia.  She died in 1904.

References

1830 births
1904 deaths
Mathews family of Virginia and West Virginia
People from Lewisburg, West Virginia
First Ladies and Gentlemen of West Virginia